Union City School, also known as West Side Middle School, is a historic school building located at Union City, Randolph County, Indiana.  It was designed by the architecture firm of Mahurin & Mahurin and built in 1920–1921. It is a two-story, brick building with Bungalow / American Craftsman design elements.  It has a "U"-shaped plan that surrounds a central auditorium.  It simple classical ornamentation including round arches with and multi-coursed brick work.  It remained in use as a school until 2003.

It was adHistoric Places in 2010.

References

School buildings on the National Register of Historic Places in Indiana
Bungalow architecture in Indiana
School buildings completed in 1921
Buildings and structures in Randolph County, Indiana
National Register of Historic Places in Randolph County, Indiana
1921 establishments in Indiana